Brian Thomas Lopes (born September 6, 1971, in Mission Viejo, California) is a professional mountain bike racer who specializes in four-cross. Lopes started riding BMX in his childhood and turned professional at seventeen years old.

He started mountain biking in 1993 and has since won a total of 18 titles – 9 NORBA National Championships, 6 UCI World Cup wins and 4 UCI World Championship titles. Lopes has also held world records in bunny hopping, in terms of both distance and height.

He was nominated in 2001 for an ESPY "Action sport Athlete of the Year" and won two NEA (World Extreme Sports Award) for "Mountain Biker of the Year" in 2000 & 2001. Lopes has also co-written a book, Mastering Mountain Bike Skills with Lee McCormack. Lopes has also been featured in a videogame; Downhill Domination on the Sony PlayStation 2.

Lopes is currently sponsored by Ibis Bicycles, Oakley, Lazer, X-Fusion, SRAM, Kenda, Novatec Wheels, WTB, ODI, Magura, Pearl Izumi, Go Pro, HT, KS, Chris King & MRP.

On April 13, 2012, Lopes won the first race of the new cross-country eliminator World Cup series in Houffalize, Belgium.

References

External links
 brianlopes.com
 uci.ch

American male cyclists
Four-cross mountain bikers
1971 births
Living people
Sportspeople from Mission Viejo, California
UCI Mountain Bike World Champions (men)
American mountain bikers